Between the Earth & Sky is a follow-up release to the breakout album Secrets and Sins by Canadian singer Luba and her band. Various musical artists appear on Between the Earth & Sky, including a saxophone solo by jazz musician Kenny G on the hit single "How Many" (produced by Narada Michael Walden). Other popular singles on the album include "Strength In Numbers," "Act of Mercy" and "Innocent (With an Explanation)."

Track listing
All songs composed by Luba.

"Strength in Numbers" – 4:27
"How Many" – 4:14
"What You Believe" – 4:28
"Even in the Darkest Moments" – 3:52
"Back to Emotion" - 4:09
"Act of Mercy" - 5:29
"Innocent (With an Explanation)" - 3:41
"Take It Like a Woman" - 4:35
"Lay Down Your Love" - 4:23
"Between the Earth and Sky" - 4:41

Personnel
 Luba: Vocals
 Peter Marunzak: Drums, Drum Programming & Noise
 Michael (Bell) Zwonok: Bass
 Mark Lyman: Guitars
 Alain Couture: Guitars & Vocals

Additional musicians
 Daniel Barbe: Keyboards & Backing Vocals
 Alain Simard: Emulator Programming
 The Sherwoods: Backing Vocals
 Kenny G: Sax Solo on "How Many"
 Sterling Crew: Keyboards on "How Many"

References
 The Ectophiles' Guide to Good Music. Luba: Credits. Retrieved Apr. 17, 2007.

External links
 Official Luba Website
 Luba at canoe.ca
 Luba on MySpace

1986 albums
Luba (singer) albums
Albums produced by Pierre Bazinet
Albums recorded at Le Studio